Women's discus throw events for wheelchair athletes were held at the 2004 Summer Paralympics in the Athens Olympic Stadium. Events were held in three disability classes, F51-53 being held jointly with F32-34 cerebral palsy athletes.

F32-34/51-53

F54/55

The F54/55 event was won by Wang Ting, representing .

Result
24 Sept. 2004, 10:00

F56-58

The F56-58 event was won by Suely Guimaraes, representing .

Result
25 Sept. 2004, 09:00

References

W
2004 in women's athletics